The Mountains classification in the Giro d'Italia is a secondary classification that is a part of the Giro d'Italia, one of cycling's Grand Tour races. In this classification, points are awarded to the leading riders over designated climbs. The climbs are put into different classifications based on difficulty and their position on that day's stage. Bonus points are given to mountain top finishes and to the first riders over the Cima Coppi, traditionally adjudged as the highest point of the entire Giro.

The classification was first calculated in 1933; from 1974 to 2011, the leader of the mountains classification in the Giro d'Italia wore the maglia verde (from ): in 2012, as part of a sponsorship deal, the jersey color was changed to blue (maglia azzurra).

History

The mountains classification was added to the Giro d'Italia in 1933. In the inaugural year of the classification, the organizers chose select climbs and awarded points to the first three riders who crossed the climbs. Alfredo Binda was first over each climb and won the first mountains classification. In 1974, the organizers added a green jersey to designate the leader of the classification. The green jersey was used until 2012, when the classification's sponsor, Banca Mediolanum, renewed its sponsorship for another four years and desired the jersey to be blue rather than green.

Winners

 The "Year" column refers to the year the competition was held, and wikilinks to the article about that edition of the race.
 The "Points" column refers to the number of points that the rider had in the mountains classification.
 The "Margin" column refers to the margin of time or points by which the winner defeated the runner-up.
 The "Stage wins" column refers to the number of stages wins the winner had during the race.

Multiple winners
As of 2022, 15 cyclists have won the mountains classification more than once.

By nationality
Riders from fifteen different countries have won the Mountains classification in the Giro d'Italia.

Distribution of points

The points that are gained by consecutive riders reaching a mountain top are distributed according to 5 categories:

The organization of the race determines which mountains are included for the mountains classification and in which category they are. The points for the Cima Coppi are awarded once every Giro, for the summit at the highest altitude in that Giro.

References

Footnotes

Citations

Giro d'Italia
Cycling jerseys
Italian sports trophies and awards